Supergirl is the name of several fictional superheroines appearing in American comic books published by DC Comics. The original, current, and most well known Supergirl is Kara Zor-El, the cousin of superhero Superman. The character made her first appearance in Action Comics #252 (May 1959) and was created by Otto Binder and Al Plastino.

Concept
Created as a female counterpart to Superman, Kara Zor-El shares his superpowers and vulnerability to Kryptonite. Supergirl plays a supporting role in various DC Comics publications, including Action Comics, Superman, and several comic book series unrelated to Superman. In 1969, Supergirl's adventures became the lead feature in Adventure Comics, and she later starred in an eponymous comic book series which debuted in 1972 and ran until 1974, followed by a second monthly comic book series, The Daring New Adventures of Supergirl, which ran from 1982 to 1984.  Supergirl was originally introduced in Action Comics #252 as the cousin of the publisher's flagship superhero, Superman in the story The Supergirl from Krypton. In most depictions, she is an alien from the planet Krypton, possessing a multitude of superhuman abilities derived from the rays of a yellow sun. Other mainstream characters have taken the name Supergirl over the years, with decidedly non-extraterrestrial origins, such as that of a superhuman artificial life-form.  The 2016 miniseries Supergirl: Being Super written by Mariko Tamaki and pencilled by Joelle Jones is a coming-of-age take on Supergirl's origins.  It depicts Kara as a seemingly ordinary teenager living in the rural Midvale with the Danvers, since the couple found her inside a pod in the middle of a field. Kara grows up aware of the pod and her unknown origins (which are glimpsed in dreams) and struggles to live a normal life as she discovers her astonishing super-human abilities, which she keeps a secret even from her closest friends.

Because of changing editorial policy at DC, Supergirl was initially killed off in the year 1985 limited series Crisis on Infinite Earths. DC Comics subsequently rebooted the continuity of the DC Comics Universe, re-establishing Superman's character as the sole survivor of Krypton's destruction. Following the conclusion of Crisis on Infinite Earths, several different characters written as having no familial relationship to Superman have assumed the role of Supergirl, including Matrix, Linda Danvers, and Cir-El. Following the cancellation of the third Supergirl comic book series (1996–2003), which starred the Matrix/Linda Danvers version of the character, a modern version of Kara Zor-El was reintroduced into the DC Comics continuity in "The Supergirl from Krypton" story within Superman/Batman #8 (February 2004). This modern Kara Zor-El stars as Supergirl in an eponymous comic book series and additionally in a supporting role in various other DC Comics publications.

Since her initial comic book appearances, the character later branched out into animation, film, television, and merchandising. In May 2011, Supergirl placed 94th on IGN's list of the Top 100 Comic Book Heroes of All Time. In November 2013, the character placed 17th on IGN's list of the Top 25 Heroes of DC Comics.

Precursors

Superwoman – The first comic ever to feature a female counterpart to Superman is "Lois Lane – Superwoman", a story published in Action Comics #60 (May 1943), in which a hospitalized Lois dreams she has gained Kryptonesque superpowers thanks to a blood transfusion from the Man of Steel. She begins her own career as Superwoman, complete with copycat costume. Similar stories with Lois Lane acquiring such powers and adopting the name "Superwoman" periodically appeared later. One such story is in Action Comics #156 (May 1951), in which Lois accidentally gains those powers through an invention of Superman's arch-foe, Lex Luthor. In the story, Lois wears a short blond wig in her crime-fighting identity, giving her an appearance almost identical to the later version of Supergirl after the latter's real name was specified as Kara Zor-El.
Supergirl – In Superboy #5 (November–December 1949) in a story titled "Superboy Meets Supergirl", Superboy meets Queen Lucy of the fictional Latin American nation of Borgonia. She is a stellar athlete and scholar. Tired of her duties and wanting to enjoy a normal life, Queen Lucy travels to Smallville, where she meets Superboy and soon wins his heart. Superboy puts on a show with her where he uses his powers to make her seem superhuman; during this contest, she is called Supergirl. As Supergirl, Queen Lucy wears a tan dress with a brown cape and Superboy's "S" symbol. Superboy later saves her from a scheming minister. She returns to her throne, leaving Superboy to wonder if she ever thinks of him.
Super-Sister – In the Superboy #78 story titled "Claire Kent, Alias Super-Sister", Superboy saves an alien woman named Shar-La from a life-threatening crash. After he ridicules her driving, Shar-La turns Superboy into a girl. In Smallville, Clark Kent (Superboy's alter ego) claims to be Claire Kent, an out-of-town relative who is staying with the Kents. When in costume, he plays Superboy's sister, Super-Sister, and claims the two have exchanged places. As a girl ridiculed and scorned by men, he wants to prove he is as good as he always was. In the end, it is revealed that the transformation is just an illusion created by Shar-La. Superboy learns not to ridicule women.
Super-Girl – In Superman #123 (August 1958), Jimmy Olsen uses a magic totem to wish a "Super-Girl" into existence as a companion and helper for Superman; however, the two frequently get in each other's way until she is fatally injured protecting Superman from a Kryptonite meteor that a criminal has dropped towards him. At her insistence, Jimmy wishes the dying girl out of existence. DC used this story to gauge public response to the concept of a completely new female counterpart to Superman. In the original issue, she has blond hair and her costume is blue and red like Superman's; indeed, it closely resembles the uniform that actress Helen Slater would later wear in the 1984 movie. Early reprints of this story show her with red hair and an orange and green costume to prevent readers from confusing her with the then current Supergirl character. Much later, the story was again reprinted in its original form.

Original character: Kara

Debut
After positive fan reaction to Super-Girl, the first recurring and most familiar version of Supergirl debuted in the year 1959. Kara Zor-El first appeared in Action Comics #252 (May 1959). The story that introduced the character was drawn by Al Plastino and written by Otto Binder, who had also created Mary Marvel, Captain Marvel's sister and female spinoff. Like Supergirl, Mary Marvel was a teen-age female version of an adult male superhero, wearing a costume that was identical to the older character's other than substituting a short skirt for tight trousers. (Binder also created Marvel Comics' Miss America, a superhero who shared little other than the name with her sometime co-star Captain America.)

Reaction to Supergirl's first appearance was tremendous, with thousands of positive letters pouring into the DC Comics offices.

Issue #8 of the Superman/Batman series originally published in 2004 re-introduced Kara Zor-El into the DC continuity. Like the pre-Crisis version, this Kara claims to be the daughter of Superman's uncle Zor-El and aunt Alura In-Ze. Unlike the traditional Supergirl, Kara is born before Superman; she is a teenager when he is a baby. She is sent in a rocket in suspended animation to look after the infant Kal-El; however, her rocket is caught in the explosion of Krypton and becomes encased in a Kryptonite asteroid. She arrives on Earth years after Kal-El, who has grown and become known as Superman. Owing to this extended period of suspended animation, she is "younger" than her cousin. She adopts the Supergirl costume and accepts the name.

A new Supergirl series, written by Jeph Loeb, began publication in August 2005. The storyline in the first arc of Supergirl depicts a darker, evil version of Kara emerging when Lex Luthor exposes her to Black Kryptonite. The evil Supergirl implies that Kara's family sent her to Earth to kill Kal-El as revenge for a family grudge. At the time, Kara herself refuses to believe this, but later flashbacks indicate that not only is this partly true, but Kara had been physically altered by her father as a child before being involved in several murders on Krypton. However, these matters were later revealed to be delusions as a result of Kryptonite poisoning. Upon being cured, she presents a personality more like that of her Silver Age persona.

Biography

Kara Zor-El (originally just Kara; Kryptonians during the Golden Era used a single name for most women, and a two-syllable name for men; thus the addition of the patronymic to the female name is a later convention) is the last survivor of Argo City, which had survived the explosion of the planet Krypton and drifted through space. The city had been covered by a plastic dome for weather moderation, devised by Zor-El, the younger brother of Jor-El, a climatologist and engineer, the father of Superman (Kal-El). The dome held together a large chunk of land mass under the city as it drifted through space in the general direction of our Solar System. However, the bottom-most layers of bedrock were affected by the explosion of the great planet's fissionable core and underwent a slow but steady chain reaction, turning into green kryptonite. Using raw deposits and refined materials at hand, the residents of Argo City laid down a ground shield of lead foil to protect them from the developing kryptonite. Zor-El was also able to fashion a makeshift propulsion system to try to accelerate the city's approach to the Solar System. During the roughly 30 years Argo City traveled through space, Zor-El met and married Alura, daughter of In-Ze, who in turn bore their daughter, Kara—blond like her parents. But before the propulsion system was able to steer the city toward Earth, a deranged citizen named Jer-Em, who was suffering from survival guilt, damaged the exhaust, veering Argo toward a swarm of meteors that crashed into the underside of the land mass on which it rested. As the inhabitants of the colony were being slain by the green kryptonite radiation released by meteorites shredding the lead barrier, the adolescent Kara was sent to Earth by Zor-El in a rocket, to be raised by her cousin Kal-El (a.k.a. Clark Kent). To ensure she would be recognized by Superman, Kara's parents provided her with a uniform which was closely based on the one Superman wears.

It later develops Zor-El and Alura survived the radiation poisoning that killed everyone else in Argo City by entering the Survival Zone, a parallel continuum akin to the Phantom Zone. They were eventually rescued by Supergirl and the couple decide to live in the bottle city of Kandor. Later, Kara is reunited with her parents, but that reunion becomes bittersweet, as Reactron kills her father and her mother dies when New Krypton is destroyed by a trap in Reactron left by Lex Luthor, her own cousin Superman's greatest enemy on Earth and now her greatest enemy on Earth as well.

On Earth, Kara acquires powers identical to Superman's and adopts the secret identity of Linda Lee, a resident of Midvale Orphanage. She conceals her blonde hair beneath a brunette wig and functions as Supergirl only in secret, at Superman's request, until she can gain, in his opinion, sufficient control of her powers — and the wisdom to properly use them. Her debut was delayed by her powers being stolen by a Kandorian villainess; during this period, she is adopted by Fred and Edna Danvers.

She attends Midvale High School as Linda Lee Danvers. In later years, after graduating from Stanhope College, she changes careers several times, holding jobs in student counseling, news reporting, and acting in a TV soap opera, Secret Hearts. She also attends college in Chicago. Kara has many boyfriends, including Richard (Dick) Malverne, Jerro the Merboy from Atlantis, and Brainiac 5, a member of the Legion of Super-Heroes. However, she has shunned serious commitments, placing her super-career first.

Supergirl's secret identity is a closely held secret known only to Superman, her foster parents, and the Legion of Super-Heroes, of which she is a member for a time. Like all Kryptonians, Supergirl is vulnerable to kryptonite. Streaky the Supercat, her orange cat, acquires temporary superpowers as a result of its exposure to "X-kryptonite," a form of kryptonite Supergirl accidentally created in an unsuccessful attempt to neutralize the effects of green kryptonite. Comet the Superhorse, a former centaur, is Supergirl's equine companion.

One way DC demonstrated the epic nature of its 12-issue limited series Crisis on Infinite Earths (April 1985 – March 1986) was through the deaths of important characters. In issue #7 (October 1985), Supergirl sacrifices her life to save her cousin and the DC Multiverse from destruction. When the Superman continuity was rebooted after Crisis on Infinite Earths, DC editors felt that Superman should be the sole survivor of Krypton, resulting in Kara being removed. Unlike a number of other characters who are shown dying in the Crisis, no one remembers Kara dying or even ever having existed.

After the events of Infinite Crisis, the sequel to Crisis on Infinite Earths, many historical events from the Multiverse are now being remembered. Donna Troy, after her rebirth and inheritance of the Harbinger's Orb, recalls the original Kara Zor-El and her sacrifice.

A Post-Crisis Supergirl appears in Supergirl and the Legion of Super-Heroes, in which she is transported to the 31st century and, as a result of her disorientation, for a time believes she is dreaming her surroundings into existence until finally convinced otherwise. Although her memories of her time with the Legion are erased before she returns to the present, the mental blocks break down upon encountering the Pre-Crisis versions of Legionnaires Karate Kid and Triplicate Girl (Una).

Supergirl exhibits new powers, manifesting sunstone crystals from her body; so far, she only does so while under great stress (for example, when Cassandra Cain tries to kill her). Supergirl's father implants the crystals within his daughter's body to protect her from malevolent beings from the Phantom Zone. The Zone dwellers are released when Jor-El creates the Phantom Zone Projector and exploits the Zone as a prison. Kara's father, believing that Kal-El is a lure to the Zone denizens, instructs Kara to destroy him. More recent comics have cast this plotline as the result of kryptonite poisoning from the kryptonite asteroid in which she was trapped.

A recently completed storyline focused on her promise to a little boy that she would save him. She tries to make good on her promise, following different avenues searching for a cure for his cancer. After he died, she tracks down a villain with the ability to jump through time, but decides not to use that solution, as she would just be doing the same thing as the villain. She accepts that sometimes she cannot save everyone.

As part of The New 52, Kara's origin was rebooted once again. An amnesiac Kara awakens after her lifepod crashes to Earth in the midst of a meteor shower. Upon emerging, she encounters humans and the extent of her powers for the first time. When encountered by Superman, she attacks him, believing him to be an impostor as her cousin was only a baby when she last saw him and she believed it to only have been a few days since then. After several battles with supervillains, including the Worldkillers, superweapons of Kryptonian design, she accepts Krypton's destruction, but continues to grapple with her grief. Her desire to restore Krypton results in her being manipulated into nearly destroying Earth by another Kryptonian whom she falls in love with. Upon realizing his manipulation, she kills him by driving kryptonite through his heart and succumbs to kryptonite poisoning.

Following her poisoning, Supergirl departs Earth to die alone. While adrift in interstellar space, she encounters a planet under attack by monsters and she intervenes to save them, unaware that the entire planet is a trap by Brainiac. She is captured and restrained by the Cyborg Superman, but after a struggle, she manages to escape. Returning to Earth, she is sent into the past by the Oracle alongside Superman and Superboy, where she ensures that a resurrected H'el cannot save Krypton. She sacrifices the planet and her family in order to save the universe.

Back on Earth, she is attacked by the assassin Lobo and, in the ensuing battle, kills him while unleashing her rage. A Red Lantern power ring finds her and attaches itself to her, transforming her into a Red Lantern. Driven insane by rage, Kara wanders through outer space, attacking everyone in her way, until captured by several Green Lanterns and brought to Hal Jordan. Immediately recognizing a Kryptonian and unable to remove the power ring without killing her, he brings her to Guy Gardner, the leader of one of the two Red Lantern factions, who manages to restore her sanity. After some time under Gardner's tutelage and protecting the galaxy as a Red Lantern, she is discharged from the Red Lantern Corps, as Guy did not want her to die needlessly fighting against Atrocitus' splinter group. On her way back to Earth, Kara encounters the leader of the Worldkillers, who are revealed to be parasitic suits of armor. He attempts to assimilate Kara as his host, but she voluntarily subjects herself to kryptonite poisoning in order to stop him and eventually flies into the Sun and removes her power ring, killing her and removing him from her body. However, Kara is revealed to be immortal while in the Sun's core and she is restored to life without the power ring or any kryptonite poisoning, immediately destroying the Worldkiller. She later helps Gardner against Atrocitus and his Red Lantern splinter group.

Post-Crisis versions
DC Editorial wanted Superman to be the only surviving Kryptonian following DC's Post-Crisis reboot of the Superman continuity. As a result, when DC reintroduced Supergirl, she needed a non-Kryptonian origin. Afterward, DC Comics tried to revamp the Supergirl concept, introducing several more non-Kryptonian Supergirls. Eventually, the rule that Superman should be the only Kryptonian survivor was relaxed, allowing for a return of Kara Zor-El as his cousin.

Matrix
After the Post-Crisis reboot in the late 1980s, Supergirl's origin was completely rewritten and no longer was she Superman's cousin or even Kryptonian.   In Superman (vol. 2) #16 (April 1988), a new Supergirl debuted as a man-made lifeform made of synthetic protoplasm created by a heroic Lex Luthor of a "pocket continuum". Lex implants her with Lana Lang's memories and she can shapeshift to resemble Lana. Known as Matrix, she even believes herself to be Lana for a time. She wears a miniskirted version of Superman's costume, but does not have Superman's exact powers. While she can fly and possesses super-strength (like Superman), she also has psychokinetic, shapeshifting, and cloaking/invisibility powers (the last makes her undetectable, even to Superman).

The Matrix's Supergirl form resembles the Pre-Crisis Supergirl and new to Earth, Matrix begins a romance with the DC Universe's Lex Luthor (known as Lex Luthor II), until she realizes Luthor's villainous nature in replicating her for an army. She leaves him to find her own way in the world aiding Superman more and more and even living in Smallville with the Kents, who treated "Mae" like their own daughter. Supergirl then began serving for a time as a member of the Teen Titans and central hero in her own right, participating in events such as Panic in the Sky, and Death and Return of Superman.

Matrix/Linda Danvers

Beginning in September 1996, DC published Supergirl (vol. 4) written by Peter David. The 1996 Supergirl comic book revamped the previous Matrix Supergirl by merging her with a human being, resulting in a new Supergirl. Many elements of the Pre-Crisis Supergirl were incorporated in new ways. The woman that the Matrix merges with has the same name as the Pre-Crisis Supergirl's secret identity, Linda Danvers. The series is set in the town of Leesburg, named after Danvers' pre-adoption surname. Linda's father is named Fred Danvers, the same as the Pre-Crisis Supergirl's adopted father. Furthermore, new versions of Dick Malverne and Comet appear as part of the supporting cast.

As the series begins, the Matrix sacrifices herself to save a dying Linda Danvers and their bodies, minds and souls merge to become an "Earth-Born Angel", a being created when one being selflessly sacrifices him or herself to save another who is beyond saving. As the angel, Supergirl loses some of her powers, but gains others, including fiery angel wings and a "shunt" ability that allows her to teleport to any place she has been before.

The angelic aspect of Supergirl eventually falls from grace, and Linda and the Matrix are separated into two beings. Linda retains some of Supergirl's super-strength and durability and, although she can no longer fly, she can leap one-eighth of a mile. Linda acts as Supergirl for a while, attempting to locate her angelic aspect. After she is found in the Garden of Eden and freed from the Demon Mother, the Matrix merges with a woman named Twilight and becomes the new Earth-Born Angel of Fire. Twilight uses her healing powers to increase Linda's strength to Supergirl's level and restores her powers of flight and telekinesis. In Supergirl (vol. 4) #75 (December 2002), detoured on her way to Earth, Kara Zor-El, the Pre-Crisis Supergirl, arrives in Post-Crisis Leesburg. After learning that Kara is destined to die, Linda travels to the Pre-Crisis universe in her place, where she marries Superman and gives birth to a daughter named Ariella. With the stipulation that her daughter be the exception in the eradication of her alternate "life", Linda ultimately allows history to unfold as it should have, with Kara assuming her rightful but tragic place in the timestream. However, finding no assurance that Ariella survived the restoration of Post-Crisis history, a dejected Linda relinquishes the role of Supergirl, sends a farewell note to Superman, and leaves for points unknown.

Peter David's creator-owned series Fallen Angel, published by DC Comics, is set in a fictional city named Bete Noire, and features a character, Lee, who is similar to Linda and explores the same themes as his Supergirl series. Prior to Fallen Angel moving to another company, Lee was written in a manner such that she could have been Linda, though David remained coy as to whether the two characters were one and the same during the DC run of the title. After it moved to IDW, David revealed Lee's origin, which clearly showed that Lee was not Danvers. However, Fallen Angel #14 introduced "Lin," who was said to be Lee's "predecessor" as the guardian of Bete Noire. Lin had recently escaped Limbo, an apparent metaphor for what happened to Danvers after the cancellation of Supergirl. David wrote in his December 13, 2006 blog entry, "Any fans of my run on Supergirl—particularly those who are torqued because Linda Danvers was consigned to oblivion in the DCU--must, must, MUST pick up "Fallen Angel" #14 and #15 when they come out next year." However, since David could not explicitly claim that a character owned by DC was the same as the character he owned, he stated, "Can I say this is Linda Danvers? Of course I can't. However, it's pretty freaking obvious that it is."

According to an interview with Newsarama, the Matrix Supergirl is wiped from existence by the events depicted in the 2005 limited series Infinite Crisis, although Infinite Crisis writer Geoff Johns later stated that Danvers is not. The debate was finally settled in the 2008 miniseries Reign in Hell, where the Shadowpact is shown trying to apprehend Linda Danvers before Linda is "recalled" to Hell.

Cir-El

A Supergirl named Cir-El appeared in 2003's Superman: The 10 Cent Adventure #1, claiming to be the future daughter of Superman and Lois Lane. Although she has super-strength, speed and hearing like Superman, she can only leap great distances. She also possesses the ability to fire blasts of red solar energy. Her alter ego is a street person named Mia. She is later found to be a human girl who was altered by Brainiac on a genetic level to appear Kryptonian; she dies thwarting a plot involving Brainiac 13. Superman (vol. 2) #200 implies that when the timeline realigned itself, Cir-El was erased from existence.

Supporting characters
Even though Supergirl is a Superman supporting character, she is also a Superman Family member, with her own set of supporting characters.

Zor-El and Alura  – Kara Zor-El's biological parents. Zor-El, the younger brother of Jor-El, is a scientist who invents the dome over Argo City and oversees the placement of lead shielding over the ground of Argo City, thus enabling the city's residents to survive the explosion of Krypton. The city drifts in space for about 15 years, the residents clinging to a precarious existence. During that time, the couple have a daughter, Kara, who grows to about the age of 10 or 12, when the city is put in peril when its lead shielding is punctured by meteors, releasing deadly Kryptonite radiation. At this point, Zor-El and Alura In-Ze place Kara in a rocket ship and send her to Earth, which Zor-El had observed using a powerful electronic telescope. Observing a super-powered man resembling his brother Jor-El, and wearing a uniform of Kryptonian styling, Zor-El and his wife conclude the man is probably their nephew, Kal-El, sent through space by Jor-El when Krypton exploded and now grown to adulthood. In later Silver Age accounts, Zor-El and Alura survive the death of Argo City when, shortly before the radiation reached lethal levels, Zor-El projects them both into the immaterial Survival Zone, a separate dimension resembling the Phantom Zone; later they are released from the Zone and go to live in the bottle city of Kandor, preserved in microscopic size at Superman's Fortress of Solitude. In the Silver Age version of the continuity, Supergirl could regularly visit with both her adoptive parents, the Danvers (see below), and her birth parents.

Streaky the Supercat – Supergirl's pet cat. In the pre-Crisis continuity, he is named after a jagged horizontal stripe of lighter fur on his side, and acquires super-powers after exposure to X-Kryptonite. In post-Crisis continuity, she is a normal housecat Supergirl takes in, whose name is taken from her inability to understand the concept of a litterbox.

Comet the Super-Horse – Pre-Crisis Supergirl's horse is a centaur accidentally cursed by Circe into being trapped in the form of a horse. In post-Crisis continuity, Comet is a superhero who is a romantic interest of Linda Danvers.

Fred and Edna Danvers – The foster parents of pre-Crisis Supergirl. Shortly after they adopt Linda Lee from the Midvale orphanage, Superman reveals his cousin's identity to them, so they are aware of her powers. Later, they also learn that Superman is secretly Clark Kent.

Dick Malverne – An orphan at the Midvale Orphanage who is one of Pre-Crisis Supergirl's romantic interests. While living at the orphanage as Linda Lee, Supergirl meets and befriends a fellow orphan, Dick Wilson. Dick suspects that Linda is secretly Supergirl and constantly tries to prove it. Later, Dick is adopted by a couple named Malverne, and changes his name to Dick Malverne. In the post-Crisis continuity, Dick Malverne is a newly arrived resident of Leesburg who befriends Linda Danvers.

Jerro the Merboy – A merperson from Atlantis who is another of pre-Crisis Supergirl's romantic interests. Superman has a similar relationship with mermaid Lori Lemaris.

Lena Thorul – Another orphan at the Midvale Orphanage who is one of Pre-Crisis Supergirl's/Linda Lee Danvers's best friends. Lena is unaware that she is the long lost younger sister of Lex Luthor. When Lena was still a small child and Lex was a teen, Lex turned evil after the laboratory accident he blamed on Superboy turned him bald. Lex's parents disowned him and told him to leave home. In order to prevent disgrace to Lena, they moved away from Smallville and told Lena that her brother had been killed in a mountain climbing accident. They changed their family name to Thorul, an anagram of Luthor. Eventually Lena's parents were killed in a car accident and Lena was sent to Midvale Orphanage. A childhood accident while playing in her brother Lex's laboratory empowered Lena with extrasensory perception.

Siobhan Smythe - Kara's best friend who mistook her for an enemy. They both bonded and later battled Siobhan's father, the Black Banshee.

Enemies
Black Flame – A Kandorian who takes to a life of crime and fights Supergirl. Introduced in Action Comics #304 (September 1963).
Blackstarr – Rachel Berkowitz discovers the secrets of the Unified Field Theory and employs it to manipulate reality as the leader of a group of neo-Nazis called the Party For Social Reform. Introduced in Supergirl vol. 2, #13 (November 1983).
Blithe – Earth-born angel servant of Carnivore who merges with the evil form of Matrix. She later becomes an ally. Introduced in Supergirl (vol. 4) #36 (September 1999).
Buzz – Gaius Marcus sells his soul to Baalzebub who goes on to become an agent for the Lords of Chaos. He would later become a shaky ally. Introduced in Supergirl (vol. 4) #1 (September 1996).
Carnivore – The son of Lilith and Baalzebub, Carnivean is the first vampire to walk the Earth and usurp the rule of Heaven. He was introduced in Supergirl (vol. 4) #32 (May 1999).
The Council – A clandestine criminal organization in Chicago that employs the Director, Matrix-Prime, and the Gang. Introduced in Daring New Adventures of Supergirl #3 (January 1983).
Decay – Daniel Pendergast manipulates Psi into trying to destroy Chicago only to be turned into a monstrous slime creature. Introduced in Daring New Adventures of Supergirl #1 (November 1982).
The Gang – A group of mercenaries whose members are Brains, Bulldozer, Ms. Mesmer, and Kong. Introduced in Daring New Adventures of Supergirl #4 (February 1983).
Lesla-Lar – A Kandorian who tries to switch places with Supergirl on several occasions. Introduced in Action Comics #279 (August 1961).
Lilith – The Mother of Demons, Lilith seeks revenge on Supergirl for destroying her son Carnivore. Introduced in Supergirl (vol. 4) #67 (April 2002).
Matrix-Prime – A powerful robot built by the Council that acts as their agent, collecting funds and eliminating threats. Introduced in Daring New Adventures of Supergirl #6 (March 1983).
Murmur – Demonic servant of Carnivore. Introduced in Supergirl (vol. 4) #33 (June 1999).
Nasthalia Luthor – Lex Luthor's niece and Supergirl's rival. Introduced in Adventure Comics #397 (September 1970).
Princess Tlaca – Aztec princess who seeks to triumph over Supergirl and restore the prestige of her civilization. Introduced in Superman Family #165 (June 1974).
Psi – Gayle Marsh is a powerful psionic manipulated by Daniel Pendergast into trying to destroy Chicago. Introduced in Daring New Adventures of Supergirl #1 (November 1982).
Reactron – The Living Reactor, Reactron seethes with radioactive energy and is able to generate concussive blasts and disintegration beams. Pre-Crisis, he is Army Sergeant Ben Krullen, who served with Tempest and developed his powers because of the hero. Post-Crisis, he is Benjamin Martin Krull and his origin is essentially the same as before. He murders Zor-El. Introduced in Daring New Adventures of Supergirl #8 (June 1983).
Reign – A Worldkiller, a biological weapon created on Krypton that was soon outlawed by the Kryptonian Science Council. Introduced in Supergirl (vol. 6) #5 (March 2012)
Siobhan McDougal/Silver Banshee – An aggressive enemy of Superman and the arch enemy of Supergirls Kara Zor-El and Linda Danvers.
Superwoman – Lucy Lane becomes her father's agent against the residents of New Krypton, bringing her into conflict with Supergirl. Lucy appears as Superwoman for the first time in Supergirl (vol. 5) #35 (January 2009).
Twilight – A New God who would curse the Presence and sees Supergirl as a means of exacting revenge. She merges with Matrix and becomes an ally. Introduced in Supergirl (vol. 4) #15 (November 1997).

Other versions

Several different versions of Supergirl have appeared in continuity.

 Power Girl (Kara Zor-L) – A version of Kara Zor-El from the parallel world Earth-Two, the cousin of Superman (Kal-L). As part of the New 52, the reintroduced Power Girl is now from Earth 2, and had used the name Supergirl in that universe.
 Laurel Gand (Andromeda) – Laurel Gand was the post-Crisis/Glorithverse replacement for the pre-Crisis Supergirl in the Legion of Super-Heroes after the latter was removed from the continuity following The Man of Steel reboot of Superman. Originally, Laurel is simply known by her given name. A younger version of Laurel takes the superhero codename "Andromeda" shortly before the Zero Hour reboot of the Legion; post-reboot, Laurel remains Andromeda.
 Ariella Kent – Supergirl of the 853rd century, later revealed to be the daughter of post-Crisis Linda Danvers and Silver Age style Superman from the Many Happy Returns story arc.

In other media

Film
Producer Ilya Salkind originally wrote a treatment for the third installment from the Superman film series starring Christopher Reeve that expanded the film's scope to a cosmic scale, introducing the villains Brainiac and Mister Mxyzptlk, as well as Supergirl. The original outline featured a father–daughter relationship between Brainiac and Supergirl and a romance between Superman and Supergirl, even though the two are cousins in the comics. Warner Bros. rejected the outline.

The first live-action depiction of Supergirl was in the eponymous 1984 film, starring Helen Slater as Kara Zor-El/Linda Lee/Supergirl. The film is a spinoff from the Salkind Superman film series, to which it is connected by Marc McClure's character, Jimmy Olsen. Its plot, which connects more traditionally to the comics than Salkind's outline, concerns Supergirl, Superman's cousin, leaving her isolated Kryptonian community of Argo City for Earth in an effort to retrieve the unique "Omegahedron", which has fallen into the hands of the evil witch Selena (Faye Dunaway). The film was poorly received and did poorly at the box office and no reference to the character was made in the subsequent Superman IV: The Quest for Peace.
 In August 2018, a film centered around Kara Zor-El / Supergirl, was announced to be in development with Oren Uziel penning the script. The studio intends to hire a female director, with Reed Morano—who has expressed interest in the project—being its top choice. Filming was expected to start production in early 2020.
In February 2021, Colombian-American actress Sasha Calle was cast as Supergirl in The Flash (2023), directed by Andy Muschietti. In February 2023, it was confirmed Calle would be portraying the Kara Zor-El version of the character
In January 2023, James Gunn announced a standalone film featuring the character Kara Zor-El / Supergirl, which would derive significantly from the Supergirl: Woman of Tomorrow (2021–22) miniseries by writer Tom King and artist Bilquis Evely.

Television

Live-action
 In the seventh season (2007–2008) of the CW's hit show Smallville, Kara is introduced into the cast and was portrayed by Laura Vandervoort. Smallville depicts her as Clark's (Tom Welling) cousin, whose spacecraft became trapped in stasis until the events of the sixth season finale, when the destruction of the dam the ship had landed near disrupted the stasis systems and allowed Kara to wake up. Much of season seven is concerned with Kara's attempts to adjust to life on Earth, especially after learning of Krypton's destruction and the fact that her "younger" cousin is now at least the same age as she. She makes guest appearances in season eight and in the show's tenth and final season, in which she becomes a Justice League member. In the season finale, she is sent into the future by the artificial intelligence of the Fortress of Solitude so that Clark can realize destiny and defeat Darkseid alone.
A television series centered around the Kara Zor-El version of Supergirl, set in the shared universe Arrowverse, titled Supergirl starring Melissa Benoist as Kara, premiered on CBS on October 26, 2015, before later moving onto The CW on May 12, 2016. In the series, Kara was sent to Earth-38 to protect her cousin Kal-El although her pod got knocked off course and became stranded in the Phantom Zone for 24 years. Eventually, Kara crashes on Earth-38 where she is rescued by an adult Kal, who is now the iconic superhero "Superman". Superman puts Kara in the care of the Danvers family who decides it best to hide her abilities from the world. Twelve years later, Kara is a reporter for Cat Co Worldwide Media. She is eventually forced to reveal her powers to the world after saving her adoptive sister Alex Danvers from a near plane crash and is dubbed "Supergirl" by the media. With the help of Department of Extra-Normal Operations (D.E.O.) director Hank Henshaw who was later revealed as J'onn J'onzz / Martian Manhunter, her best friend Winn Schott and James Olsen / Guardian, Kara fights aliens and prisoners lead by her evil aunt Astra, who attempt to invade Earth. She is later joined by Lex Luthor’s sister Lena, the Daxamite Mon-El, Querl Dox,(Brainiac-5) and Nia Nal / Dreamer in fighting enemies such as Mon-El's parents, the World Killer Reign, Red Daughter, alien activist Ben Lockwood / Agent Liberty and the evil secret organisation Leviathan.

Animation
 Supergirl was voiced by Nicholle Tom in Superman: The Animated Series, an American television show. She is depicted as Kara In-Ze, not Superman's cousin as in the comic book, but rather a near-Kryptonian from Krypton's sister planet Argos. Argos was jolted from its orbit by Krypton's explosion into a much further orbit and only Kara survived freezing to death. When Superman finds her, he brings her back to Earth and treats her as a cousin. As continued in Justice League Unlimited, she and Superman grow very close, almost like siblings, but she departs when she falls in love with Brainiac 5 of the Legion of Super-Heroes in the distant future, feeling that she had never really fit in on Earth in the present.
 Superman/Batman: Apocalypse, a direct-to-video animated film released in September 2010, largely parallels the origin-story arc launched in the Superman/Batman comic series in 2004, with some minor plot differences. Kara Zor-El, voiced by Summer Glau, is described unambiguously as Kal-El's cousin from Krypton.
 DC Super Hero Girls or DC Superhero Girls (in various countries) is an American super hero action figure franchise created by DC Comics (a subsidiary of Time Warner) and Mattel that launched in the third quarter of 2015. The franchise was announced in April 2015. The range is to include books from Random House, Lego tie-ins and action figures from Mattel. The website was launched in early July 2015. Characters featured at launch were Wonder Woman, Batgirl, Supergirl, Harley Quinn, Poison Ivy, Katana and Bumblebee. Other characters including Hal Jordan, Barry Allen, Star Sapphire, Beast Boy, Cheetah, Hawkgirl and Catwoman also appear. Amanda Waller is featured as the principal of the series' setting Super Hero High. Many other DC Comics Heroes and Villains appear in the background as cameos. The story is about at Super Hero High School, well-known DC heroes attend classes and deal with all the awkwardness of growing up (with the added stress of having superpowers). Supergirl was voiced by Anais Fairweather. A movie DC Super Hero Girls: Hero of the Year based on the series, was released in 2016. She also appeared in the 2019 TV series of the same name, voiced by Nicole Sullivan.
 Melissa Benoist reprises her role of Overgirl in the animated web series Freedom Fighters: The Ray, set in the same continuity as the CW's Supergirl.

Video games
 Supergirl appears as a playable character in Justice League Heroes exclusive for PlayStation Portable.
 A Lego minifigure version of Supergirl appears as a playable character in Lego Batman 2: DC Super Heroes, Lego Batman 3: Beyond Gotham, and will appear in the DC TV Super-Heroes DLC pack in Lego DC Super-Villains.
 Supergirl makes a cameo appearance in the IOS version of Injustice: Gods Among Us as a support card.
 Supergirl appears as a playable character in Injustice 2, voiced by Laura Bailey. In the story, her escape pod is retrieved by Black Adam after the events of the first game. She is trained by Black Adam and Wonder Woman into perfecting her powers as they tell her stories of her cousin, inspiring her to become Supergirl. After the Regime and Insurgency ally with each other to take out Brainiac (who was responsible for Krypton's destruction), Kara discovers what the Regime has truly done on the planet and is appalled by her cousin's actions. She and Batman infiltrate Brainiac's ship to stop the tyrant, and when Batman and Superman argue with each other over the Brainiac's fate, she allies herself with Batman, believing that her cousin is behaving more like General Zod than Jor-El. She appears in both of the game's endings, where she will either become a part of Batman's Justice League to recapture what her cousin stood for before Lois' death, or will be imprisoned by Superman until she becomes a part of his Regime. In her single player ending, she works with the Justice League to revive the Kryptonian civilizations of Argo City and Kandor.

Supergirl appeared in Lego Dimensions as a playable character voiced by Kari Wahlgren who alongside Green Arrow were only available during the Lego convention BrickLive. However, she eventually including Aquaman and Lloyd Garmadon from Ninjago appeared in the PS4 version of the Starter Pack. She shares most of her abilities with Superman, but unlike in previous Lego games, she can turn into a Red Lantern, which is a reference to the comic “Red Daughter of Krypton”.

See also
 Miss Martian, created as a stand-in for Supergirl in Teen Titans
 Team Superman, the name for the unofficial team of Superman and his supporting characters
 Woman warrior
 List of women warriors in folklore

References

External links
 The Official Supergirl Site
 Supergirl History
 A History Of Supergirl
 
 

Fictional characters who can turn invisible
Fictional angels
Fictional characters from parallel universes
Extraterrestrial superheroes
DC Comics telekinetics
DC Comics characters with superhuman senses
DC Comics characters with superhuman strength
DC Comics characters who can move at superhuman speeds
 
Superman characters code names
Kryptonians
DC Comics characters with accelerated healing
DC Comics female superheroes
Fictional characters with superhuman durability or invulnerability
Superheroes who are adopted
Articles about multiple fictional characters
Comics adapted into television series
Comics spin-offs
Comics characters introduced in 1958
Comics about women
Characters created by John Byrne (comics)
1959 comics debuts
Superhero comics